Fredrik Nyberg born 1968 in Partille, is a Swedish writer and poet.

Nyberg serves on the editorial board of the Swedish literary publication OEI

Bibliography 

 En annorlunda praktik 1998 (translated into English by Jennifer Hayashida as A Different Practice)
 Blomsterur 2000
 Åren 2002
 Det blir inte rättvist bara för att båda blundar 2006
 Pandi och kamelen träffar surikaterna 2007
 Nio, nine, neun, neuf 2008

Awards 

 2006 Guldprinsen (Swedish prize for poetry)
 2008 Shortlisted for the poetry prize of the Best Translated Book Award for A Different Practice

References

Swedish male writers
Swedish-language writers
1968 births
Living people
Swedish male poets
Date of birth missing (living people)
People from Partille Municipality
20th-century Swedish people